Abdulsamed Damlu (born 25 July 1999) is a Turkish professional footballer who plays as a goalkeeper for Süper Lig club Yeni Malatyaspor .

Professional career
A youth product of Yeni Malatyaspor, Damlu signed his first professional contract with them in 2014 and acted as their backup goalkeeper. He joined Sandıklıspor on loan for the second half of the 2015-16 season. He made his professional debut with Yeni Malatyaspor in a 1-0 Süper Lig win over Antalyaspor on 3 October 2020.

References

External links
 
 

1999 births
Living people
People from Karlıova
Turkish footballers
Yeni Malatyaspor footballers
Süper Lig players
Association football goalkeepers